Aslackby Preceptory in Lincolnshire lay to the south-east of Aslackby Church. Until about 1891 a tower, possibly of the preceptory church, together with a vaulted undercroft, survived as part the Temple farmhouse. Temple farmhouse was subsequently rebuilt and a 15th-century window and a stone pinnacle remain in the garden

History of the preceptory
The preceptory was, according to William Dugdale, founded either in or before 1164. This is recorded in Dugdale’s Monasticom, which states that Hubert de Rye presented the Templars with church of Aslackby with its chapel "in the year when Thomas, archbishop of Canterbury departed from the King  at Northampton" – i.e., 1164. After the order was suppressed in the first decade of the 14th century, the property passed to Temple Bruer.

The Templars
The word preceptory is used for the community of the Knights Templar which lived on one of the order's estates in the charge of its preceptor. From that its meaning was extended to include the estate and its buildings. The one at Aslackby was founded in 1192. Little of its structure survives, but early descriptions and sketches indicate that its church was like that at Temple Bruer Preceptory, a chancel with an apsidal east end and a round nave to its west. This was a standard design for Templar churches, in imitation of the Church of the Holy Sepulchre in Jerusalem. The best-known example in England is the Temple Church at the western end of the City of London. Later, towers were built at both the Lincolnshire churches, the one at Aslackby apparently around 1200, on the south side of the round nave.

See also
Eagle, Kesteven
Witham Preceptory, Kesteven
Willoughton Preceptory, Lindsey

References

Bibliography
Antram N (revised), Pevsner N & Harris J, (1989), The Buildings of England: Lincolnshire, Yale University Press. 
Charles G. Addison The History of the Knights Templars (1997) 
Larking, L B. and Kemble, J. M (1857), The Knights Hospitallers in England: Being a Report of the Prior Philip de Thame to the Grand Master Elyan de Villanova for A.D. 1338 Camden Society, pp. 153–156
Mills, D. The Knights Templar in Kesteven North Kesteven District Council (c.1990)
Sister Elspeth (1906) in Page, William,(ed). A History of the County of Lincoln Volume 2. Victoria County History. pp. 210–213 Houses of Knights Templars: Willoughton, Eagle, Aslackby, South Witham and Temple Bruer.
White, A.  (1981) The Knights Templar of at Temple Bruer and Aslackby,  Lincolnshire Museums Archaeology Series No.25.

External links
.

Monasteries in Lincolnshire
England in the High Middle Ages
History of Lincolnshire
Medieval sites in England
Castles and fortifications of the Knights Templar
1192 establishments in England
Christian monasteries established in the 12th century